Cathrine Margrethe Gjerpen (born 18 September 1987) is a Norwegian sailor. She was born in Oslo, and represents the Royal Norwegian Yacht Club. She competed at the 2008 Summer Olympics in Beijing, where she placed 28th in the Laser Radial class.

References

External links

Norwegian female sailors (sport)
1987 births
Living people
Sportspeople from Oslo
Sailors at the 2008 Summer Olympics – Laser Radial
Olympic sailors of Norway